Polyptychus wojtusiaki is a moth of the  family Sphingidae. It is distributed in Nigeria.

References

Endemic fauna of Nigeria
Polyptychus
Insects of West Africa
Moths of Africa
Moths described in 2001